The BBC Sports Personality of the Year 2018 took place on 16 December 2018 at the Resorts World Arena in Birmingham. It was the 65th presentation of the BBC Sports Personality of the Year Award.

The event, broadcast live on BBC One, was hosted by Gary Lineker, Clare Balding and Gabby Logan.

Des Clarke and Jazmin Sawyers provided the pre-show entertainment. George Ezra, Paloma Faith and Freya Ridings performed during the show. The Lightning Seeds along with David Baddiel and Frank Skinner performed "Three Lions" whilst a montage of England's run to the football World Cup semi final was played.

Nominees
The nominees for the award were revealed during the ceremony.

Other awards
In addition to the main award as "Sports Personality of the Year", several other awards will also be presented:

BBC Sports Personality of the Year Coach Award: Gareth Southgate
BBC Sports Unsung Hero Award: Kirsty Ewen

BBC Sports Personality Greatest Sporting Moment of the Year
On 3 December 2018 the nominees for the inaugural Greatest sporting moment of the year were announced. The winner was decided by public vote (online only) between the 3 December 2018 at 18.30 GMT and 14 December 2018 at 20.00 GMT. It was announced that England netball's last second win over Australia for the Commonwealth games title had been voted sporting moment of the year.
 England's historic netball gold
 England win penalty shootout
 Alastair Cook's farewell century
 Tiger Woods' first win in five years
 Tyson Fury fights back from knockdowns

BBC Sports Personality World Sport Star of the Year
Formerly known as the BBC Overseas Sports Personality of the Year, the nominees for the award were announced on 3 December. People from outside of the UK could participate in the voting for the first time. Voting took place online between the 3 December 2018 at 15:00 GMT and 15 December 2018 at 14:00 GMT. The winner was Italian golfer, Francesco Molinari.

BBC Sports Personality Team of the Year
The Nominations for Team of the year were announced on the night of the ceremony. The nominees were:
 England Football 
 Ireland Rugby Union
 Celtic F.C.
 England Netball
 European Ryder Cup
 Manchester City F.C.
 Mercedes F1
 Team Sky

England Netball team was announced as the winners of the team of the year award.

BBC Sports Personality Lifetime Achievement Award

Billie Jean King became the third woman and third tennis player to be given the Lifetime achievement award. King had won 39 Grand Slam titles in both singles and doubles competitions throughout her career, with 20 coming at Wimbledon. In 1961 King and Karen Hantze Susman became the youngest pair to win the women's doubles title at Wimbledon. Throughout her career King was world singles number one in six years and won 129 singles titles in total, with the very last one coming in Birmingham where the award was presented. King also won 7 Fed Cup titles as a player and a further 4 as a captain. Away from the court King founded the Women's Tennis Association and was an advocate of gender equality defeating Bobby Riggs in the Battle of the Sexes match. King was inducted into the Tennis Hall of Fame in 1987 and was given the Presidential Medal of Freedom in 2009. King used her speech to remind people to continue to influence and inspire others.

BBC Young Sports Personality of the Year
The original 10 were shortlisted to Adenegan, Anderson and Bowen. At the BBC Radio 1 Teen Awards in October 2018 it was announced that Kare Adenegan had won the award.

Helen Rollason award
The Helen Rollason award was given to racing driver Billy Monger. Monger had both his legs amputated after an accident during a Formula 4 race in April 2017. He returned to racing in March 2018 in the British Formula 3 Championship (F3). He took his first pole position in F3 upon his return to the scene of the accident. Monger finished sixth overall in the championship, with three podium finishes and another pole position to his name.

In Memoriam

Roger Bannister
Peter Thomson Celia Barquin Arozamena
Alan Oakman John Murray
Kevin Beattie Paul Madeley
Bob Matthews Matt Campbell
Mick O'Toole John Dunlop
Neale Cooper Alan Gilzean
Maria Bueno
Enzo Calzaghe Brendan Ingle
Jimmy McIlroy Roy Bentley
Carol Mann Anne Donovan Celia Brackenridge
Ray Wilson
Norman Sheil Paul Sherwen
Geoff Gunney Harold Poynton Cliff Watson
Ray Wilkins
Jimmy Armfield
Scott Westgarth Dean Francis Chris Edwards
Mike Tucker Tim Stockdale
Ian Williams John Mantle Harry Walker
Liam Miller Jlloyd Samuel Davide Astori
Eric Bristow
Paul Alcock Doug Ellis
Angus Black Gareth Williams Haydn Morgan
Albert Sewell Peter Brackley
William Dunlop Dan Kneen Adam Lyon
Ellie Soutter Tazmin Pugh
Cyrille Regis

References

External links
Official website

BBC Sports Personality of the Year awards
BBC Sports Personality of the Year Award
Bbc
BBC Sports Personality of the Year Award
BBC Sports Personality of the Year Award
Bbc